Balpakram National Park is a national park to the south of Garo Hills in Meghalaya, India, located at an altitude of about  close to the international border with Bangladesh. It was inaugurated in December 1987 and provides habitat for barking deer, Asian golden cat, Bengal tiger, marbled cat, wild water buffalo, red panda and Indian elephant. Balpakram means "land of the eternal wind" according to the myth of the Garo people.

UNESCO tentative list
The Central government of India has nominated the Garo Hills Conservation Area (GHCA), straddling South and West Garo Hills district in Meghalaya, as a World Heritage Site, which includes Balpakram National Park. It has been listed in UNESCO World Heritage tentative list.

Flora and fauna 

Balpakram National Park is home to wide species of plants and animals. Its vegetation consists of subtropical, grassland, bamboo forest, tropical deciduous trees and carnivorous plants like the pitcher-plant and Drosera.

Species recorded include Indian elephant, chital deer, wild water buffalo, red panda, Bengal tiger, and marbled cat. The rivers and lakes in the wildlife reserve are home to various species of birds.

Balpakram myths 

A Schima wallichii tree has a depression on its trunk. Local people believe that it was caused by spirits that take rest here on their way to their abode of the dead and tether animals killed on their funeral.

Visitor information 
The best time to visit Balpakram National Park is from late October to May, when the weather is pleasant without rainfall. The park can be reached from Shillong by road from Guwahati airport to Tura and Baghmara. Entry fees will have to be paid at the park's gate.

References

External links

National parks in Meghalaya
1987 establishments in Meghalaya
Protected areas established in 1987